Lyde may refer to:
Lyde of Lydia,mother of Alyattes
Samuel Lyde (1825–1860), British missionary in Syria and pioneering author on the Alawite sect
Lyde Baronets, of Ayot St Lawrence in the County of Hertford, title in the Baronetage of Great Britain
River Lyde, Buckinghamshire, river in Buckinghamshire and tributary of the River Thames

It may also refer to:
Barlow Lyde & Gilbert (BLG), is an international law firm headquartered in London, United Kingdom
Jackie Frazier-Lyde (born 1962), American lawyer and former professional boxer, daughter of Joe Frazier
John Lyde Wilson (1784–1849), the 49th Governor of South Carolina from 1822 to 1824, an ardent supporter of dueling
Lyde Browne (antiquary) (died 1787), 18th-century English antiquary and banker
Lyde Browne (British Army officer) (died 1803), officer in the 18th-century British Army
Pipe and Lyde, village and civil parish in Herefordshire, England